Michael Haydn's Trumpet Concerto in C major, MH 60,  was completed in 1763, and "is one of the most difficult in the entire repertory." The work is in two movements:

I. Adagio
II. Allegro molto

Confusingly, this concerto is sometimes listed as Trumpet Concerto No. 2 in C major, but the Trumpet Concerto No. 1 in D major, MH 104, is technically two excerpts from a divertimento and not a concerto proper.

Besides the solo trumpet in C, the concerto is scored for 2 flutes, strings, and continuo. Part of the difficulty of the concerto is because of the very high notes for the trumpet, which is written even higher than the flutes (indeed, the solo trumpet part is much higher than would be advisable for the modern trumpet, while the flute parts are too low for modern flutes to be heard clearly against a full string section). Both movements provide room for a cadenza; Edward H. Tarr's edition for Musica Rara writes out cadenzas in the trumpet part but not in the conductor's score. Tarr's cadenza for the second movement even goes up to a G above high C but provides ossia for the next lower G.

Discography

Niklas Eklund has recorded it with the Drottningholm Baroque Ensemble conducted by Nils-Erik Sparf on a Naxos Records album entitled The Art of the Baroque Trumpet, Vol. 4, which includes other concertos for natural trumpet (i.e., no valves, keys or slides). But generally, recordings of Michael Haydn's Trumpet Concerto typically also include Joseph Haydn's much more famous Trumpet Concerto in E-flat major.

See also
Joseph Haydn, older brother of Michael Haydn, also wrote a trumpet concerto

References

Compositions by Michael Haydn
Haydn
Compositions in C major
1763 compositions